Favorin is a surname. Notable people with the surname include:

Ellen Favorin (1853–1919), Swedish-speaking Finnish painter
Yury Favorin (born 1986), Russian pianist

See also
Favorinus (80s–160s), Roman sophist and philosopher